Marcel Parent (born 25 October 1934) is a French sabre fencer. He competed at the 1960, 1964 and 1968 Summer Olympics.

References

1934 births
Living people
French male sabre fencers
Olympic fencers of France
Fencers at the 1960 Summer Olympics
Fencers at the 1964 Summer Olympics
Fencers at the 1968 Summer Olympics
Fencers from Paris